Ryan Palmer (born 23 January 1974) is a chess player of Jamaican origin; he was the Jamaican National Champion in 1992. During the academic years of 2004-2007, he taught mathematics at Adams' Grammar School in Newport, Shropshire, and now has moved to the United States, to pursue further studies. In both 2006 and 2007, he and his teammates were the Shropshire Chess League Division 1 Champions. In 2007, Palmer accomplished one win, one draw, and one loss leading to an accumulative score of 50%. He later returned to the UK to teach at St Olaves Grammar School, Orpington and is now teaching maths at Richmond Park Academy

References

External links
 The Chess Drum Article
 
 Ryan Palmer 365Chess.com

1974 births
Living people
Jamaican chess players
People from Newport, Shropshire